Lesbian, gay, bisexual, and transgender (LGBT) persons in North Korea may face social challenges due to their sexuality or gender identity. However, homosexuality is not illegal. Other LGBT rights in the country are ambiguous as they are not formally addressed in the penal code.

Criminal laws and the legality of same-sex sexual activity 

Homosexuality and transgender issues are not formally addressed in the penal code, which makes other LGBT rights in the country generally ambiguous. 

In 2011, The Korea Times, a South Korean publication, claimed that North Korea had executed a lesbian couple for being influenced by capitalism and "bringing corruption of public morals". In the article, the source was Free North Korea Radio, itself a project of the Defense Forum Foundation, a U.S.-based nonprofit organization.

Article 193 outlaws the creation, distribution or possession of "decadent" culture, whereas Article 194 outlaws sexually explicit media as well as engaging in "decadent" behavior. However, it is unclear if this is related to LGBT.

Recognition of same-sex relationships
There currently exists no North Korean law that recognizes same-sex marriage, civil unions or domestic partnerships.

Constitutional law 

The Constitution of North Korea, last revised in 2019, does not explicitly address discrimination on the basis of sexual orientation or gender identity.
The Constitution does broadly guarantee its citizens many civil, cultural, economic and political rights, including "enjoy equal rights in all spheres of State and public activities".

Military service 
The North Korean military law mandates celibacy during the first 10 years of service for all enlistees, without regard to their sexual orientation or gender of any sexual partners. Reportedly, male soldiers regularly break this rule by engaging in casual heterosexual and homosexual affairs; these homosexual relationships have been described as situational sexual behavior rather than a sexual orientation, and may result in execution.

Adoption and family planning
According to the United States State Department in its 2020 report on North Korea, same-sex couples could not legally adopt children in North Korea.

Politics and propaganda 
In 2008 and 2011, North Korea opposed both the "joint statements on ending acts of violence and related human rights violations based on sexual orientation and gender identity" at the United Nations that condemn violence and discrimination against LGBT people. Its precise reasons for doing so remain unclear.

In the short story "Snowstorm in Pyongyang" (평양에서 눈보라, published 2000), captured crewmen of the USS Pueblo implore their North Korean captors to allow them to engage in gay sex.

In 2014, after the United Nations Human Rights Council published a report on human rights in North Korea advising a referral to the International Criminal Court, the official Korean Central News Agency responded with an article that included homophobic insults against report author Michael Kirby, who is openly gay. The KCNA's article went on to state that gay marriage "can never be found in the DPRK boasting of the sound mentality and good morals, and homosexuality has become a target of public criticism even in Western countries, too. In fact, it is ridiculous for such gay  to sponsor dealing with others' human rights issue."

Culture 
Defectors have testified that most North Koreans are unaware of the concepts of sexual orientation other than heterosexual exists. Most LGBT people only realized after they had defected that the ideas of homosexuality, bisexuality, and transgender identity exist. Due to cultural differences, while close same-sex relationships exist, they are seen differently from the western concepts of homosexuality. 

Same-sex behavior is reported to be present in the military specially in remote regions between young soldiers and senior officers. Cross-dressing openly is also reported to exist. Such behavior is said to be largely tolerated and are not a major social issue or a topic of discussion in North Korean society compared to South Korea, as it is not seen as something out of the ordinary.

Jang Yeong-jin is the only openly gay North Korean defector. Yeong-jin faced discrimination while in South Korea, which is itself a country that is generally conservative on LGBT rights themselves.

See also 

Human rights in North Korea
LGBT rights in Asia
LGBT rights in South Korea
Jang Yeong-jin

References 

Human rights in North Korea
Sexuality in North Korea
North Korea
LGBT in Korea